Brambles Limited is an Australian company that specialises in the pooling of unit-load equipment, pallets, crates and containers. It is listed on the Australian Securities Exchange.

History
Brambles traces its history to 1875, when Walter Bramble established a butchery business in Newcastle, the operations of which he gradually expanded into transport and logistics. Brambles was listed on the Australian Securities Exchange in 1954, as W E Bramble & Sons Limited and entered the pallet pooling business in 1958 through the purchase of the Commonwealth Handling Equipment Pool (CHEP), from the Australian Government. This same year the company changed its name to Brambles Industries Limited and moved its head office from Newcastle to Sydney.

In 1970, Brambles entered the waste disposal market with the purchase of the Australian subsidiary of Purle Brothers Holdings. In 1972, Brambles entered the armoured car market in partnership with Brink's. In 1972, Brambles purchased the Port Jackson & Manly Steamship Company. Brambles main interest in the business, was a 50% shareholding in Tidewater Port Jackson Marine, which operated six platform supply vessels. Following a threat by Brambles to withdraw the loss-making Manly ferry service, the Public Transport Commission took over the service in December 1974. In 1975, Brambles formed an 80:20 joint venture with UK company Guest Keen & Nettlefold (GKN) to bring CHEP to the United Kingdom.

In July 1984, Grace Removals was purchased. In 1988, Brambles became the largest private rail wagon operator in Europe acquiring Groupe CAIB of Brussels and Procor's United Kingdom business. In 1996, Brambles Transport Services was sold to Toll Holdings.

In June 2000, Brambles sold its Eurotainer container business to Ermewa and Brinks Brambles armoured car unit to Chubb Security.

In August 2001, the support services activities of GKN (which included interest in CHEP and Cleanaway) were merged into a separate company, Brambles Industries plc (listed on the London Stock Exchange) which then entered became a dual-listed company with Brambles Industries Limited. In December 2001, the Wreckair equipment hire business was sold to Coates Hire.

In March 2002, the United Transport and Brambles Project Services businesses were sold to Patrick Corporation. In October 2002, the railway leasing business was sold to VTG-Lehnkering. In November 2002 the Brambles Shipping business, including the ships Tasmanian Achiever and Victorian Reliance, was sold to Toll Holdings.

In 2006, the company's Australian waste management business, Cleanaway Australia and its Brambles Industrial Services business were sold to Kohlberg Kravis Roberts. Cleanaway UK was sold to Veolia. Following these divestments, Brambles unified its Australian and British-listed entities into a single entity, Brambles Limited, that was listed on the Australian Securities Exchange in November 2006. Brambles maintained a secondary listing on the London Stock Exchange until March 2010.

In December 2013, the Recall storage business was spun-off.

Operations / acquisitions
In 2008, Brambles acquired LeanLogistics.
 IFCO in April 2011.
 Pallecon in January 2013.
 BXB Digital in 2016.

References

External links
Official site

Business services companies of the United Kingdom
Business services companies established in 1875
Companies based in Sydney
Companies formerly listed on the London Stock Exchange
Companies listed on the Australian Securities Exchange
Conglomerate companies of Australia
Defunct shipping companies of Australia
Security companies of Australia
Transport companies of Australia
Transport companies established in 1875
1875 establishments in Australia